Back Creek is a small rural locality in the Mid-Coast Council, part of the Mid North Coast region of New South Wales, Australia.

References

Suburbs of Mid-Coast Council